John of Bourbon (John I/VII, Count of La Marche and of Vendôme), (1344 – 11 June 1393, Vendôme) was French prince du sang as the second son of James I, Count of La Marche and Jeanne of Châtillon.

Life
John was captured as a young man at the Battle of Poitiers, but ransomed. Following the deaths of his father and elder brother at the Battle of Brignais, John succeeded them as Count of La Marche.

John took an active part in the Hundred Years' War, and became Governor of Limousin after helping reconquer it from the English. Later he joined Bertrand du Guesclin in his campaign of 1366 in Castile. In 1374, his brother-in-law Bouchard VII, Count of Vendôme died, and John became Count of Vendôme and Castres in right of his wife.

John joined the campaign of Charles VI 1382 in Flanders (which culminated in the Battle of Roosebeke) and fought in 1392 in Brittany.

John rebuilt the castles of Vendôme and Lavardin.

Marriage and children
On 28 September 1364, John married Catherine of Vendôme, countess of Vendôme (d. 1412) and daughter of John VI, Count of Vendôme.

He had seven children by Catherine:
 James II, Count of La Marche and Castres (1370–1438).
 Isabelle (b. 1373), a nun at Poissy.
 Louis, Count of Vendôme (1376–1446).
 John, Lord of Carency (1378–1457), married c. 1416 Catherine, daughter of Philip of Artois, Count of Eu, without issue, married in 1420 at Le Mans, his mistress Jeanne de Vendômois, with whom he had issue.
 Anne (c. 1380 – September 1408, Paris), married in 1401 John of Berry, Count of Montpensier (d. 1401), married in Paris in 1402 Louis VII, Duke of Bavaria.
 Marie (1386 – aft. 11 September 1463), Lady of Brehencourt, married Jean de Baynes, Lord of Croix.
 Charlotte (1388 – 15 January 1422), married in 1411 at Nicosia King Janus of Cyprus.

References

Sources

Bourbon-La Marche, John I of
Bourbon-La Marche, John I of
House of Bourbon
Bourbon-La Marche, John I of
La Marche, John I of Bourbon, comte de
Bourbon, John I of
Counts of Castres
14th-century peers of France
French prisoners of war in the Hundred Years' War